Filatima roceliella is a moth of the family Gelechiidae. It is found in North America, where it has been recorded from Washington.

The wingspan is about 17 mm. The forewings have a distinct, median, longitudinal fuscous streak suffused and irrorated with light ochreous. There are longitudinal ochreous streaks along the veins. The hindwings are pale fuscous.

References

Moths described in 1942
Filatima